The Best of Village People is a compilation album by American disco group Village People, released by Casablanca Records in 1994. AllMusic critic Steve Huey calls it "the clear-cut choice for disco and camp fanatics who want a detailed portrait of the group's career."

Track listing

Personnel
Village People
Victor Willis – cop, lead vocals
Ray Simpson – cop, lead vocals (tracks 3, 6)
Alex Briley – military man
David Hodo – construction worker
Glenn M. Hughes – biker
Randy Jones – cowboy
Felipe Rose – Indian chief

Technical
Jacques Morali – producer
Henri Belolo – executive producer
Horace Ott – string and horn arranger and conductor
Michael Hutchinson – assistant producer, engineer
Harry Weinger – compilation producer
Bill Levenson – compilation executive producer
Richard Bauer – project director
Terri Tierney – project coordinator
Catherine Ladis – project assistant
Wayne Edwards – essay
Mark Weinberg – package design
Joseph M. Palmaccio – digital remastering
Bruce Pilato Archives – photo

References

1994 greatest hits albums
Village People albums
Casablanca Records compilation albums